Gillette is an American brand of safety razors and other personal care products.

Gillette may also refer to:

Places in the United States 
 Gillette, New Jersey, an unincorporated community
 Gillette, Wyoming, a city
 Gillette, Florida, an unincorporated community
 Gillette Historic District, a residential historic district and neighborhood in Tulsa, Oklahoma

People 
 Gillette (surname)
 Gillette (singer), American singer and rapper Sandra Gillette (born 1974)
 Gillette (wrestler), a ring name of Japanese professional wrestler Yohei Fujita

Other uses 
 Gillette Stadium, a stadium in Foxborough, Massachusetts, United States
 Gillette station, a railway station in Long Hill Township, New Jersey, United States
 Gillette Children's Specialty Healthcare, a hospital in St. Paul, Minnesota, United States
 , two United States Navy destroyer escorts
 Lieutenant Gillette (Pirates of the Caribbean), a recurring character in the Pirates of the Caribbean film series
 Gillette, a nonstandard unit of measurement for the penetration ability of a laser

See also 
 Gilette, a commune in the Alpes-Maritimes department of France
 Gillett (disambiguation)
 Penn Jillette